Mesodica aggerata is a moth in the Carposinidae family. It is found on Java.

References

Natural History Museum Lepidoptera generic names catalog

Carposinidae